Psyllipsocus ramburii is a species of cave barklouse in the family Psyllipsocidae. It is found in Africa, Australia, the Caribbean, Europe, Northern Asia (excluding China), Central America, North America, Oceania, South America, and Southern Asia.

References

Trogiomorpha
Articles created by Qbugbot
Insects described in 1872